The 2014 UMass Minutemen football team represented the University of Massachusetts Amherst in the 2014 NCAA Division I FBS football season. This was their first year with head coach Mark Whipple, who returned after 10 years coaching in the NFL. The Minutemen divided their home schedule between two stadiums. Three home games were played at Gillette Stadium in Foxborough, Massachusetts. The other three were played on the UMass campus at Warren McGuirk Alumni Stadium, which  reopened after a renovation to bring the facility up to FBS standards. This season was UMass's third in the Mid-American Conference in the East Division. They finished the season 3–9, 3–5 in MAC play to finish in a tie for fourth place in the East Division.

Schedule

Game summaries

Boston College

Colorado

Vanderbilt

Penn State

Bowling Green

Miami (OH)

Kent State

Eastern Michigan

Toledo

Ball State

Akron

Buffalo

References

 

UMass
UMass Minutemen football seasons
UMass Minutemen football